Maria Testa (5 February 1956 – 13 September 2009) was an Italian archer. She competed in the women's individual event at the 1992 Summer Olympics.

References

External links
 

1956 births
2009 deaths
Italian female archers
Olympic archers of Italy
Archers at the 1992 Summer Olympics
Sportspeople from Rome